No More Mr. Nice Guy is the debut studio album by American hip hop duo Gang Starr. The album was released on April 22, 1989. It peaked at #83 on the Billboard R&B chart. The song "Positivity" peaked at #19 on the Billboard rap chart.

Critical reception
Trouser Press wrote that "DJ Premier provides samples, beats and rhythms that are perfectly adequate, if not up to his future level."

Track listing 
All songs are produced by DJ Premier & Guru, except for tracks #5 & #13 produced by The 45 King

The PRT Records cassette issue in the UK contains "Movin' On (Vocal)" and "Movin' On (Dub)" as bonus tracks B7 and B8.

Singles

Charts

Singles

References 

1989 debut albums
Gang Starr albums
Albums produced by the 45 King
Albums produced by DJ Premier
Albums produced by Guru
EMI Records albums
Wild Pitch Records albums